The London and North Western Railway (LNWR) Improved Precedent Class or Renewed Precedent Class is a class of  steam locomotives originally designed for express passenger work. They later gained the nickname of Jumbos.

History

The locomotives were designed by F. W. Webb. A total of 158 were built in batches by Crewe Works 1887–1897 with two further additions in 1898 and 1901 respectively. They were officially "renewals" (i.e. replacements) of 96 Newton Class and 62 Precedent Class, so that, for accountancy purposes, they could be charged against the Revenue account rather than the Capital account of a "new" locomotive. On renewal, they kept the numbers and names of their predecessors, and as a result the numbering system continued to be completely haphazard.

Withdrawals started in December 1905.

The London, Midland and Scottish Railway acquired 76 upon the grouping of 1923, and gave them the power classification 1P. The LMS assigned these the numbers 5004–79, in order of build date, though not all received them as withdrawals continued apace. By the end of 1933, only 5001 Snowdon survived and in April 1934 it was renumbered 25001 to clear the number 5001 for an LMS Stanier Class 5 4-6-0, but was withdrawn in October that year.

Accidents and incidents
One person was killed.
The express was derailed and Hardwicke was severely damaged. The accident was caused by the driver of the freight misreading signals.

On 14 August 1915, a locomotive hauling a passenger train suffered a mechanical defect which resulted in track being damaged at Weedon, Northamptonshire. Locomotive No. 1189 Stewart was one of two hauling a mail train that was derailed on the damaged track. Ten people were killed and 21 were injured.

Preservation 

One, No. 790 Hardwicke (built 1892, LMS No. 5031, withdrawn 1932) has been preserved as part of the National Railway Collection. It was overhauled in 1976 and hauled some excursion trains on the main line, on one of which it double-headed with Flying Scotsman. In the same year it made a special run on the Settle - Carlisle railway, double heading with Midland compound 1000, to celebrate the line's centenary. During this period it was allocated TOPS number 98 190. It is currently a static exhibit in the National Railway Museum Shildon.

Fleet list

† LMS number allocated, but never applied

References

Notes

Sources

External links 

Photo of 260 Duke of Connaught from 1900
Photo of 1672 Talavera from 1900

Precedent, improved
2-4-0 locomotives
Railway locomotives introduced in 1887
Standard gauge steam locomotives of Great Britain
Passenger locomotives